Allopterigeron is a genus of flowering plants in the daisy family described as a genus in 1981.

There is only one known species, Allopterigeron filifolius, endemic to Australia. It is known from Queensland and Northern Territory.

References

Endemic flora of Australia
Monotypic Asteraceae genera
Inuleae